The Panthessaliko Stadium is a stadium located at Volos, Greece. The stadium was the site of football (soccer) matches during the 2004 Summer Olympics. It was officially opened on July 30, 2004 and has a capacity of 22,700 seats, though only 21,100 seats were made publicly available for the Olympic matches. The Panthessaliko Stadium is the home stadium of the Volos N.F.C. who plays on the Super League Greece. It also hosted the 2017 Greek Football Cup Final, where PAOK defeated AEK 2–1. It hosted the 2020 Greek Football Cup Final between AEK and Olympiacos. In 2022, it hosted a pair of matches of the Greece national football team both won by Greece.

References

Olympicproperties.gr profile

External links
Stadia.gr profile

Venues of the 2004 Summer Olympics
Athletics (track and field) venues in Greece
Football venues in Greece
Multi-purpose stadiums in Greece
Olympic football venues
Sport in Volos
Sports venues completed in 2004